Pete Rushefsky is an American klezmer musician and Executive Director of New York City's Center for Traditional Music and Dance.  He plays the cimbalom or "tsimbl" as well as the 5-string banjo.

He has a book published called Essentials of Klezmer 5-String Banjo, Volume I.

In 2022, Rushefsky won a Bubbe Award for “Best Original Klezmer Composition”

Discography 

 Git Azoy (it's good this way) (2000?) with the 12 Corners Klezmer band 
 Tsimbl un Fidl: Klezmer Music for Hammered Dulcimer and Violin (2001) with Elie Rosenblatt.
 Af di gasn fun der shtot - On the Streets of the City (2003) with Beyle Schaechter-Gottesman and others.
 On the paths: Yiddish songs with tsimbl (2004) with Becky Kaplan.
 Fleytmuzik in Kontsert (2008) with Adrianne Greenbaum and Jacob Shulman-Ment.

References

External links
 Tsimbl.com An article on tsimbls by Pete Rushefsky
 Dumneazu Blog article on Pete Rushefsky and Tsimbls
 Center for Music and Traditional Dance website
 Concert and Lecture-Demonstration Series  at Syracuse University featuring Pete Rushefsky

Jewish American musicians
Klezmer musicians
Living people
Year of birth missing (living people)